Lasmo plc was a British oil and gas exploration and production business. It was listed on the London Stock Exchange and was a constituent of the FTSE 100 Index.

History
The Company was founded in 1971 as London and Scottish Marine Oil (LASMO) to explore the North Sea. It struck oil in the Ninian Field in 1974 and was first listed on the London Stock Exchange in 1977. In the early 1990s it expanded its operations into Indonesia, Algeria and Pakistan. It bought Ultramar plc in 1991 in a hostile takeover battle.

It successfully fought off a hostile bid from Enterprise Oil in 1994. It expanded into Venezuela in 1997 paying $453m for an interest in the Dacion Field. In 1999 it acquired Monument Oil & Gas for £460m.

In 2001 it was acquired by Eni, who successfully outbid an initial offer from Amerada Hess.

References

Non-renewable resource companies established in 1971
Companies formerly listed on the London Stock Exchange
Defunct companies based in London
Defunct oil companies
Defunct oil and gas companies of the United Kingdom
Energy companies established in 1971
1971 establishments in England